Hwang Hee-chan (born 26 January 1996) is a South Korean professional footballer who plays as a forward for Premier League club Wolverhampton Wanderers and the South Korea national team.

Hwang is nicknamed the "Bull" (Hwangso; Hangul: 황소) in South Korea due to his aggressive playing style. It was a play on his surname as hwangso was the Korean term for a bull.

Early life and youth career
Hwang Hee-chan was born in Chuncheon, but his family moved to Bucheon right after his birth. They lived there until he was eleven years old. Hwang started to play football at Singok Elementary School in Uijeongbu. In 2008, he scored the most goals in both Hwarangdaegi Tournament and Dongwon Youth Cup, which were South Korean national youth competitions. His strong performance continued in the South Korean national under-12 team. Hwang scored 22 goals in the Kanga Cup, setting a new record of the tournament. With outstanding performances in these competitions, he was awarded the grand prize of the Cha Bum-kun Football Award, given to the best youth footballers in South Korea.

After graduating from Singok Elementary School, he entered Pohang Jecheol Middle School and started to play in Pohang Steelers under-15 team, the school's affiliated football club. In 2011, his team won the middle school division of the Korean National School League, hosted by Korea Football Association, and Hwang received the MVP award of the competition.

Subsequently, he joined Pohang Jecheol High School and Pohang Steelers under-18 team. In the 2013 K League Junior, contested between youth teams of K League clubs, he scored 12 goals in 12 games for his team, helping his high school to win the league. Afterwards, in the high school division of the National School League, he once again led Pohang to the title, becoming the MVP in addition to the top scorer.

Club career

Red Bull Salzburg 
In December 2014, Pohang Steelers intended to sign forward Hwang Hee-chan as a homegrown player, however he opted to sign with Austrian club Red Bull Salzburg. On 3 November 2016, Hwang came off the bench and scored a brace in a Europa League match for Salzburg against Ligue 1 side Nice, contributing to his team's first Europa win of the campaign. He failed to score in his first Austrian Bundesliga season.

During the 2017–18 season Salzburg had their best ever European campaign. They finished top of their UEFA Europa League group for a record fourth time before beating Real Sociedad and Borussia Dortmund, thus making their first-ever appearance in the competition's quarter-finals. On 12 April, Hwang scored a goal against Lazio, leading a 4–1 victory to proceed to the semi-finals. On 3 May 2018, Hwang played in the second away match of the semi-final, when Salzburg defeated Marseille by 1–2 but lost on aggregate 3–2. On 31 August 2018, Hwang joined Hamburger SV on a loan deal until the end of the 2018–19 season.

During the 2019–20 season, Hwang drew plaudits alongside Salzburg's attacking players Erling Haaland and Takumi Minamino. The trio were particularly praised for their exploits in the Champions League, where Hwang was involved in eight goals by recording three goals and three assists, and winning two penalty kicks. His playing style was described as energetic with accurate passing and an eye for dribbling. In all competitions, Hwang had a remarkable season, scoring 16 goals and providing 22 assists in 40 appearances.

RB Leipzig 
On 8 July 2020, Hwang signed for RB Leipzig on a five-year contract. On 12 September, he scored a goal and created an assist against Nürnberg in the first round of the 2020–21 DFB-Pokal, where he made his debut. He helped Leipzig to reach the 2021 DFB-Pokal Final by scoring against VfL Wolfsburg and Werder Bremen, though he was a substitute. However, he failed to score in his first German Bundesliga season.

Wolverhampton Wanderers
On 29 August 2021 Hwang joined Premier League side Wolverhampton Wanderers on a season long loan. On 11 September, Hwang scored Wolves' second goal away to Watford on his debut as a second-half substitute in a 2–0 win. He then got his first goals at Molineux on 2 October, as he scored both goals in Wolves' 2–1 win against Newcastle United, both strikes coming from similarly tight angles. He scored five goals in his debut campaign in the Premier League.

On 26 January 2022, the club announced that they had activated a clause in his loan deal that would see him join the club on a permanent deal on 1 July 2022, upon the expiration of his loan, signing a contract until 2026.

International career
In the 2012 AFC U-16 Championship, South Korea was eliminated in the quarter-finals, but Hwang became the top scorer of the tournament with five goals including a hat-trick against North Korea.

Hwang participated in the 2016 Summer Olympics and scored a goal in a group match against Germany, which finished in a 3–3 draw.

In a friendly on 28 March 2018, Hwang scored South Korea's second goal against Poland, with the match ending in a 3–2 loss.

In the 2018 FIFA World Cup, Hwang played all three group stage matches for South Korea. He featured in the starting line-up in the first two games, both of which were defeats. Hwang participated in the last game against Germany as a substitute but was then brought off after 20 minutes due to difficulties executing the team's tactics. South Korea finally won a victory in the game, with manager Shin Tae-yong expressing regret for taking off Hwang.

Hwang scored a goal in stoppage time against Portugal to secure a 2–1 win, and a place in the Round of 16 of the 2022 FIFA World Cup.

Career statistics

Club

International

Scores and results list South Korea's goal tally first, score column indicates score after each Hwang goal.

Honours
Red Bull Salzburg
Austrian Bundesliga: 2015–16, 2016–17, 2017–18, 2019–20
Austrian Cup: 2015–16, 2016–17, 2019–20
 
RB Leipzig
DFB-Pokal runner-up: 2020–21

South Korea U23
Asian Games: 2018
AFC U-23 Championship runner-up: 2016

Individual
AFC U-16 Championship top goalscorer: 2012
Korean FA Goal of the Year: 2022

References

External links

Profile at the Wolverhampton Wanderers F.C. website
Hwang Hee-chan – National Team Stats at KFA 

1996 births
Living people
People from Chuncheon
Association football forwards
South Korean footballers
South Korea under-17 international footballers
South Korea under-20 international footballers
South Korea under-23 international footballers
South Korea international footballers
South Korean expatriate footballers
Austrian Football Bundesliga players
2. Liga (Austria) players
FC Red Bull Salzburg players
FC Liefering players
Expatriate footballers in Austria
South Korean expatriate sportspeople in Austria
Footballers at the 2016 Summer Olympics
Olympic footballers of South Korea
2018 FIFA World Cup players
Footballers at the 2018 Asian Games
Asian Games medalists in football
Asian Games gold medalists for South Korea
Medalists at the 2018 Asian Games
2. Bundesliga players
2019 AFC Asian Cup players
Bundesliga players
RB Leipzig players
Expatriate footballers in Germany
South Korean expatriate sportspeople in Germany
South Korean expatriate sportspeople in England
Premier League players
Wolverhampton Wanderers F.C. players
Hamburger SV players
Sportspeople from Gangwon Province, South Korea
2022 FIFA World Cup players